Microtea, the jumby peppers, are a genus of flowering plants in the family Microteaceae, native to the Caribbean islands, Central America, and South America.

Species
Microtea was originally placed in the Phytolaccaceae, but now have their own family, the Microteaceae. Species currently accepted by The Plant List are as follows: 
Microtea debilis Sw. (weak jumby pepper)
Microtea glochidiata Moq. 
Microtea longebracteata H. Walter 
Microtea maypurensis (Kunth) G.Don 
Microtea paniculata Moq. 
Microtea portoricensis Urb. (Puerto Rico jumby pepper)
Microtea scabrida Urb. 
Microtea sulcicaulis Chodat 
Microtea tenuifolia Moq.

References

Caryophyllales
Plants described in 1788
Caryophyllales genera
Taxa named by Olof Swartz